Mathur-II is a village in the Palakkad district, state of Kerala, India. It forms a part of the area administered by Mathur gram panchayat.

Demographics
 India census, Mathur-II had a population of 12,324 with 6,087 males and 6,237 females.

References

Mathur-II